During its 69-year history, the Soviet Union usually had a de facto leader who would not necessarily be head of state but would lead while holding an office such as premier or general secretary. Under the 1977 Constitution, the chairman of the Council of Ministers, or premier, was the head of government and the chairman of the Presidium of the Supreme Soviet was the head of state. The office of the chairman of the Council of Ministers was comparable to a prime minister in the First World whereas the office of the chairman of the Presidium was comparable to a president. In the ideology of Vladimir Lenin, the head of the Soviet state was a collegiate body of the vanguard party (as described in What Is To Be Done?).

Following Joseph Stalin's consolidation of power in the 1920s, the post of the general secretary of the Central Committee of the Communist Party became synonymous with leader of the Soviet Union, because the post controlled both the Communist Party and the Soviet government both indirectly via party membership and via the tradition of a single person holding two highest posts in the party and in the government. The post of the general secretary was abolished in 1952 under Stalin and later re-established by Nikita Khrushchev under the name of the first secretary. In 1966, Leonid Brezhnev reverted the office title to its former name. Being the head of the Communist Party of the Soviet Union, the office of the general secretary was the highest in the Soviet Union until 1990. The post of general secretary lacked clear guidelines of succession, so after the death or removal of a Soviet leader the successor usually needed the support of the Political Bureau (Politburo), the Central Committee, or another government or party apparatus to both take and stay in power. The President of the Soviet Union, an office created in March 1990, replaced the general secretary as the highest Soviet political office.

Contemporaneously to the establishment of the office of the president, representatives of the Congress of People's Deputies voted to remove Article 6 from the Soviet constitution which stated that the Soviet Union was a one-party state controlled by the Communist Party which in turn played the leading role in society. This vote weakened the party and its hegemony over the Soviet Union and its people. Upon death, resignation, or removal from office of an incumbent president, the Vice President of the Soviet Union would assume the office, though the Soviet Union dissolved before this was actually tested. After the failed coup in August 1991, the vice president was replaced by an elected member of the State Council of the Soviet Union.

Summary 
Vladimir Lenin was voted the chairman of the Council of People's Commissars of the Soviet Union (Sovnarkom) on 30 December 1922 by the Congress of Soviets. At the age of 53, his health declined from the effects of two bullet wounds, later aggravated by three strokes which culminated with his death in 1924. Irrespective of his health status in his final days, Lenin was already losing much of his power to Joseph Stalin. Alexei Rykov succeeded Lenin as chairman of the Sovnarkom and although he was de jure the most powerful person in the country, in fact, all power was concentrated in the hands of the "troika" - the union of three influential party figures: Grigory Zinoviev, Joseph Stalin, and Lev Kamenev. Stalin continued to increase his influence in the party, and by the end of the 1920s, he became the sole dictator of the USSR, defeating all his political opponents. The post of general secretary of the party, which was held by Stalin, became the most important post in the Soviet hierarchy

Stalin's early policies pushed for rapid industrialisation, nationalisation of private industry and the collectivisation of private plots created under Lenin's New Economic Policy. As leader of the Politburo, Stalin consolidated near-absolute power by 1938 after the Great Purge, a series of campaigns of political murder, repression and persecution. Nazi Germany invaded the Soviet Union in June 1941, but by December the Soviet Army managed to stop the attack just shy of Moscow. On Stalin's orders, the Soviet Union launched a counter-attack on Nazi Germany which finally succeeded in 1945. Stalin died in March 1953 and his death triggered a power struggle in which Nikita Khrushchev after several years emerged victorious against Georgy Malenkov.

Khrushchev denounced Stalin on two occasions, first in 1956 and then in 1962. His policy of de-Stalinisation earned him many enemies within the party, especially from old Stalinist appointees. Many saw this approach as destructive and destabilizing. A group known as Anti-Party Group tried to oust Khrushchev from office in 1957, but it failed. As Khrushchev grew older, his erratic behavior became worse, usually making decisions without discussing or confirming them with the Politburo. Leonid Brezhnev, a close companion of Khrushchev, was elected the first secretary the same day of Khrushchev's removal from power. Alexei Kosygin became the new premier and Anastas Mikoyan kept his office as chairman of the Presidium of the Supreme Soviet. On the orders of the Politburo, Mikoyan was forced to retire in 1965, and Nikolai Podgorny took over the office of chairman of the Presidium. The Soviet Union in the post-Khrushchev 1960s was governed by a collective leadership. Henry A. Kissinger, the American National Security Advisor, mistakenly believed that Kosygin was the leader of the Soviet Union and that he was at the helm of Soviet foreign policy because he represented the Soviet Union at the 1967 Glassboro Summit Conference. The "Era of Stagnation", a derogatory term coined by Mikhail Gorbachev, was a period marked by low socio-economic efficiency in the country and a gerontocracy ruling the country. Yuri Andropov (aged 68 at the time) succeeded Brezhnev in his post as general secretary in 1982. In 1983, Andropov was hospitalized and rarely met up at work to chair the politburo meetings due to his declining health. Nikolai Tikhonov usually chaired the meetings in his place. Following Andropov's death fifteen months after his appointment, an even older leader, 72-year-old Konstantin Chernenko, was elected to the general secretariat. His rule lasted for little more than a year until his death thirteen months later on 10 March 1985.

At the age of 54, Mikhail Gorbachev was elected to the general secretariat by Politburo on 11 March 1985. In May 1985, Gorbachev publicly admitted the slowing down of the economic development and inadequate living standards, being the first Soviet leader to do so while also beginning a series of fundamental reforms. From 1986 to around 1988, he dismantled central planning, allowed state enterprises to set their own outputs, enabled private investment in businesses not previously permitted to be privately owned, and allowed foreign investment, among other measures. He also opened up the management of and decision-making within the Soviet Union and allowed greater public discussion and criticism, along with the warming of relationships with the West. These twin policies were known as perestroika (literally meaning "reconstruction", though it varies) and glasnost ("openness" and "transparency"), respectively. The dismantling of the principal defining features of Soviet communism in 1988 and 1989 in the Soviet Union led to the unintended consequence of the Soviet Union breaking up after the failed August 1991 coup led by Gennady Yanayev.

List of leaders 
The following list includes persons who held the top leadership position of the Soviet Union from its founding in 1922 until its 1991 dissolution.
 
Note: that † denotes leaders who died in office.

List of troikas 

On four occasionsthe 2–3-year period between Vladimir Lenin's incapacitation and Joseph Stalin's leadership; the three months following Stalin's death; the interval between Nikita Khrushchev's fall and Leonid Brezhnev's consolidation of power; and the ailing Konstantin Chernenko's tenure as General Secretarythe Soviet Union was governed by a council known as a troika (i.e."triumvirate"), whereby policymaking depended on the consensus of three chief figures within the Politburo.

See also 
Index of Soviet Union-related articles
List of heads of state of the Soviet Union
List of presidents of the Russian Federation
Premier of the Soviet Union
Vozhd
President of Russia

Notes

References

Citations

Sources

External links 
 Succession of Power in the USSR from the Dean Peter Krogh Foreign Affairs Digital Archives
 Heads of State and Government of the Soviet Union (1922–1991)

Leaders Of The Soviet Union
Leaders Of The Soviet Union